Charles Miller or Charlie Miller may refer to:

Arts and entertainment
 Bronco Charlie Miller (1850-1955), American showman and Old West figure
 Charles F. Miller (1878–1925), American actor
 Charles Henry Miller (1842–1922), artist and painter
 Charles Miller (actor), actor in Thundering Trails (1943) and The Black Hills Express (1943)
 Charles Miller (author) (1918–1986), author of popular books on East African history
 Charles Miller (director) (1857–1936), American film director
 Charles Miller (musician) (1939–1980), in the band War

Politics
 Charles E. Miller (1903–1979), American politician and businessman in Maryland
 Charles H. Miller (1918-1971), American politician and farmer in Minnesota
 Charles Miller (Kentucky politician) (born 1939), state legislator in Kentucky
 Charles A. Miller (Alabama politician), Secretary of State of Alabama, 1868–70
 Charles A. Miller (Pennsylvania politician) (1850–1917), American businessman, newsworker, and politician from Harrisburg, Pennsylvania
 Charles R. Miller (politician) (1857–1927), governor of Delaware
 Charlie Miller (North Carolina politician), member of the North Carolina House of Representatives
 Charles W. Miller (born 1863), American lawyer and politician in Indiana

Sports
 "Steeplejack" Charles Miller (1882–1910), American climber
 Charles Darley Miller (1868–1951), polo player at the 1908 Summer Olympics
 Charles William Miller (1874–1953), father of Brazilian football
 Charlie Miller (pinch hitter) (1877–1951), Major League Baseball player
 Charlie Miller (shortstop) (1892–1972), Major League Baseball player
 Charlie Miller (born 1976), Scottish footballer
 Ookie Miller (Charles Lewis Miller, 1909–2002), National Football League player
 Charles Miller (Canadian football) (born 1953), Canadian football player
 Charles Lichty Miller (1887–?), American college football player and coach

Other
 Charles A. Miller (political scientist) (born 1937), professor emeritus of politics and American studies Lake Forest College
 Charles Miller (businessman) (1843–1927), founder of Galena-Signal Oil Company, commander of the Pennsylvania National Guard Division
 Charles Miller (educator), inducted into the Omaha Black Music Hall of Fame in 2005
 Charles Miller (entrepreneur), serial entrepreneur and former NASA senior manager, known for Nanoracks and Lynk Global
 Charles Miller (gambler) (1851–1881), gambler and confidence man
 Charles Miller (medium) (1870–1943), American spiritualist medium
 Charlie Miller (security researcher), known for identifying Apple product security flaws
 Charles Vance Millar (1853–1926), Canadian lawyer and financier
 Charles R. Miller (general), United States Army general 
 Charles Ransom Miller (1849–1922), editor-in-chief of The New York Times

See also
 Chuck Miller (disambiguation)